The 2017 TCR International Series Salzburgring round was the fifth round of the 2017 TCR International Series season. It took place on 11 June at the Salzburgring.

Dušan Borković won the first race starting from second position, driving an Alfa Romeo Giulietta TCR, and Roberto Colciago gained the second one, driving a Honda Civic Type-R TCR.

Ballast
Due to the results obtained in the previous round, Roberto Colciago received +30 kg, Frédéric Vervisch +20 kg and Stefano Comini +10 kg.

Classification

Qualifying

Notes
 — Attila Tassi and Robert Huff was sent to the back of the grid for Race 1, after an engine change. Which in Tassi case was a car change after his big crash in the Friday test session.
 — Roberto Colciago was given a 5 place grid penalty after the Monza round, for a collision with Maťo Homola in Race 2. However, since Attila Tassi and Robert Huff had to start from the back of the grid for the same race, Colciago started from 13th position instead of 15th.
 — Davit Kajaia had his best laptime deleted during Q1, after improving his sector and laptime during yellow flags.

Race 1

Race 2

Standings after the event

Drivers' Championship standings

Model of the Year standings

Teams' Championship standings

 Note: Only the top five positions are included for both sets of drivers' standings.

References

External links
TCR International Series official website

Monza
TCR International Series
TCR